Coprobacter secundus is a Gram-negative, obligately anaerobic, rod-shaped and non-spore-forming bacterium from the genus of Coprobacter which has been isolated from human faeces.

References

External links
Type strain of Coprobacter secundus at BacDive -  the Bacterial Diversity Metadatabase

Bacteroidia
Bacteria described in 2015